The men's 3000 metres steeplechase event at the 2004 World Junior Championships in Athletics was held in Grosseto, Italy, at Stadio Olimpico Carlo Zecchini on 14 and 17 July.

Medalists

Results

Final
17 July

Heats
14 July

Heat 1

Heat 2

Heat 3

Participation
According to an unofficial count, 33 athletes from 22 countries participated in the event.

References

3000 metres steeplechasechase
Steeplechase at the World Athletics U20 Championships